Corporal is a rank in use (in some form) by most armies.

Corporal may refer to:

Corporal punishment, a form of physical punishment involving the use of pain
MGM-5 Corporal, the first guided missile authorised by the US to carry a nuclear warhead
Corporal (liturgy), a piece of white linen used during Mass
WAC Corporal, a sounding rocket developed at White Sands Missile Range
Corporal Kirchner, an American professional wrestler
Corporal Robinson, an American professional wrestler
Corporal Punishment (wrestler), an American professional wrestler
Isadore "Corporal Izzy" Schwartz ("The Ghetto Midget"), American world champion flyweight boxer
Corporal (band), an alternative folk band.
Ladona, a genus of dragonflies often treated as part of the genus Libellula